The North West Cape ctenotus (Ctenotus iapetus)  is a species of skink found in Western Australia.

References

iapetus
Reptiles described in 1975
Taxa named by Glen Milton Storr